Năm Căn is a rural district of Cà Mau province in the Mekong Delta region of Vietnam. As of 2003 the district had a population of 68,769. The district covers an area of 533 km². The district capital lies at Năm Căn.

Divisions
The district is divided into the following communes:

 Năm Căn (urban municipality)
 Hàm Rồng
 Đất Mới
 Hàng Vịnh
 Hiệp Tùng
 Tam Giang
 Tam Giang Đông
 Lâm Hải

References

Districts of Cà Mau province